Francisco de Paula Enrique María Luis de Borbón y Borbón (16 November 1912 – 18 November 1995) was a Spanish aristocrat and a distant relative of the Spanish royal family. He had a brilliant and outstanding military career as a Lieutenant General and commander of the cavalry in the Spanish Army.

Life and family
He was born in Santander as the youngest child and second son of Francisco de Borbón y de la Torre (1882–1953) and his wife, Enriqueta de Borbón y Parade, 4th Duchess of Seville (1888–1967). He descended from a morganatic line of the Spanish branch of the House of Bourbon and was a relative of King Juan Carlos I of Spain. He renounced his rights to succeed to his mother's ducal title in 1968, in favour of his eldest son.

Marriages and issue
He was married on 4 October 1942 at Madrid to Enriqueta Escasany y Miquel (13 October 1925 in Málaga – 16 May 1962 in Málaga), daughter of Ignacio Escasany y Ancell and Enriqueta de Miquel y Mas, 2nd . The couple had two sons:
 Francisco de Borbón y Escasany, 5th Duke of Seville (born 16 November 1943 in Madrid)
 ∞ Countess Beatrice Wilhelmine Paula von Hardenberg (28 June 1947 in Donaueschingen – 14 March 2020 in Marbella), daughter of Count Günther von Hardenberg and Princess Maria Josepha Egona zu Fürstenberg, on 7 July 1973 at Baden-Baden, and divorced on 30 June 1989 in Madrid, with issue:
 Olivia Enriqueta María Josefa de Borbón y Hardenberg (born 6 April 1974 in London)
 ∞ Julián Porras-Figueroa Toledano (born 3 October 1982 in Castilla la Mancha) on 4 October 2014 at Marbella, with issue:
 Flavia María Josepha Porras y de Borbón (born 30 November 2016)
 Fernando Enrique Porras y de Borbón (born 14 August 2018)
 Cristina Elena de Borbón y Hardenberg (2 September 1975 in Madrid – 13 February 2020 in Madrid)
  (born 21 January 1979 in Madrid)
 ∞ Isabelle Eugénie Karanitsch (born 23 November 1959 in Vienna), daughter of Franz M. Karanitsch and Tatjana Cimlov Karacevcev, on 19 October 1991 at Vienna, and divorced on 17 June 1993 in Madrid, without issue.
 ∞ María de los Ángeles de Vargas-Zúñiga y Juanes (born 19 November 1954 in Lugo), daughter of Manuel de Vargas-Zúñiga y la Calzada and María de los Ángeles de Juanes y Lago, on 2 September 2000 at Marbella, without issue (however, she has two children from a previous marriage to Ernesto Díaz Bastien).
 Alfonso Carlos de Borbón y Escasany (born 10 February 1945 in Madrid)
 ∞ María Luisa Yordi y Villacampa (born 15 April 1949 in Madrid), daughter of Lucian Yordi and María Luisa Villacampa, on 2 July 1971 at Madrid, with issue:
 Alfonso Nicolás Enrique de Borbón y Yordi (born 16 November 1973 in Madrid)
 ∞ María Eugenia Silva Hernández-Mancha (born 13 January 1976 in Madrid), daughter of Antonio Silva Jaraquemada and María Eugenia Hernández Mancha, with issue:
 Alfonso de Borbón y Silva (born 1 April 2014 in Madrid)
 Jerónimo de Borbón y Silva (born 14 June 2017 in Madrid)
 Alejandra María Luisa de Borbón y Yordi (born 24 May 1976 in Madrid)
 ∞ Juan Bosco de Ussía Hornedo, son of Alfonso de Ussía y Muñoz-Seca and María del Pilar Hornedo y Muguiro, on 20 June 2008 at Guadalajara, with issue:
 Tristan de Ussía y Borbón (born 31 October 2011 in Madrid)
 Santiago de Ussía y Borbón (born 31 October 2011 in Madrid)

Francisco married for the second time on 15 March 1967 at Madrid to María Josefa García de Lóbez y Salvador (11 December 1928 in Madrid – 28 March 2002 in Madrid), daughter of Nicolas García and Dolores Salvador. They had one son:
 Enrique Ignacio de Borbón y García de Lóbez (born 18 March 1970 in Madrid)

Order of Saint Lazarus

Order of Saint Lazarus (statuted 1910)
 Grand Master (1956–1967 and 1973–1995); elected after the death of his father
 Coadjutor (1935)
During his tenure, the order suffered a schism which led to the development of two obediences, termed the Malta Obedience and the Paris Obedience. He continued to lead the Malta Obedience until his death in 1995. Under his leadership, a 1986 attempt to reunite the two obediences proved unsuccessful; they were subsequently reunited in 2008, after his death.

Patrilineal descent

Francisco's patriline is the line from which he is descended from father to son.

Patrilineal descent is the principle behind membership in royal houses, as it can be traced back through the generations, which means that Francisco is a member of the House of Bourbon.

House of Bourbon

Robert of Hesbaye, c. 765–807
Robert III of Worms, 800–834
Robert the Strong, 820–866
Robert I of France, 866–923
Hugh the Great, 898–956
Hugh Capet, c. 939–996
Robert II of France, 972–1031
Henry I of France, 1008–1060
Philip I of France, 1052–1108
Louis VI of France, 1081–1137
Philip II of France, 1165–1223
Louis VIII of France, 1187–1226
Louis IX of France, 1214–1270
Robert, Count of Clermont, 1256–1317
Louis I, Duke of Bourbon, 1279–1342
James I, Count of La Marche, 1319–1362
John I, Count of La Marche, 1344–1393
Louis, Count of Vendôme, 1376–1446
John VIII, Count of Vendôme, 1426–1478
Francis, Count of Vendôme, 1470–1495
Charles, Duke of Vendôme, 1489–1537
Antoine of Navarre, Duke of Vendôme, 1518–1562
Henry IV of France, 1553–1610
Louis XIII of France, 1601–1643
Louis XIV of France, 1638–1715
Louis, Grand Dauphin of France, 1661–1711
Philip V of Spain, 1683–1746
Charles III of Spain, 1716–1788
Charles IV of Spain, 1748–1819
Infante Francisco de Paula of Spain, 1794–1865
Infante Enrique, Duke of Seville, 1823–1870
Francisco de Paula de Borbón y Castellví, 1853–1942
Francisco de Borbón y de la Torre, 1882–1952
Francisco de Borbón y Borbón, 1912–1995

References

1912 births
1995 deaths
Nobility from Madrid
Grandees of Spain
Recipients of the Order of Saint Lazarus (statuted 1910)
Grand Masters of the Order of Saint Lazarus (statuted 1910)
People from Santander, Spain